The 2022–23 Rutgers Scarlet Knights women's basketball represents Rutgers University in the 2022–23 college basketball season. Led by first year head coach Coquese Washington, the team plays their games at the Jersey Mike's Arena and are members of the Big Ten Conference.

Schedule and results

|-
!colspan=12 style=|Regular season

|-
!colspan="6" style=| Big Ten Women's Tournament

See also
 2022–23 Rutgers Scarlet Knights men's basketball team

References

Rutgers Scarlet Knights women's basketball seasons
Rutgers Scarlet Knights
Rutgers Scarlet Knights women's basketball
Rutgers Scarlet Knights women's basketball